Seychelles Olympic and Commonwealth Games Association (IOC code: SEY) is the National Olympic Committee representing Seychelles in Olympic, Youth Olympic and Asian Games. It was created in 1979. As the name suggests, the body is also responsible for the Seychelles participation in the Commonwealth Games and Youth Games as the local Commonwealth Games Association.

Presidents of Committee
 1992–present – Antonio Gopal

See also
Seychelles at the Olympics
Seychelles at the Commonwealth Games

References

Seychelles
Seychelles
 
Olympic